Bodwen is a hamlet in the civil parish of Lanlivery in mid Cornwall, England, United Kingdom. It is situated just over one mile (2 km) north-northeast of Bugle village and five miles (8 km) north of St Austell. It is about two and a half miles south of Lanivet. There is also a place called Bodwen in the civil parish of Helland. It is in the civil parish of Luxulyan. Its low population lives in a total of 7 houses.

References

Hamlets in Cornwall